Great and Little Preston is a civil parish in the metropolitan borough of the City of Leeds, West Yorkshire, England.  The parish contains two listed buildings that are recorded in the National Heritage List for England.  Both the listed buildings are designated at Grade II, the lowest of the three grades, which is applied to "buildings of national importance and special interest".  The parish contains the villages of Great Preston and Little Preston, and the surrounding area.  The listed buildings consist of a large house, and a barn and stables.


Buildings

References

Citations

Sources

Lists of listed buildings in West Yorkshire